Joel Belz (born 1941) is the founder of God's World Publications which began with God's WORLD News publications for children in 1981, and which today also includes the World Journalism Institute started in 1999 and WORLD magazine, a biweekly Christian newsmagazine, in 1986, and various podcast programs.

Personal life
Belz was raised in the grain and lumber business, but learned the importance of the print media when his parents opened up a printing business out of their home. In 1946 his father entered the Presbyterian ministry and in 1951 his parents opened Cono Christian School.  He earned a BA in English from Covenant College in Lookout Mountain, GA in 1962 and an MA in communications from the University of Iowa in 1971. He is a member and elder in the Presbyterian Church in America. Belz and his wife, Carol Esther, have five children and sixteen grandchildren.  They currently live in North Carolina.

In November 2009, Belz signed an ecumenical statement known as the Manhattan Declaration calling on evangelicals, Catholics and Orthodox not to comply with rules and laws permitting abortion, same-sex marriage and other matters that go against their religious consciences.

References

External links
 List of Joel Belz' columns
 God's World News
 World Magazine

1941 births
Living people
Presbyterian Church in America members
Covenant College alumni
University of Iowa alumni
American columnists
American magazine publishers (people)